Reed Baker-Whiting (born March 31, 2005) is an American soccer player who plays as a midfielder for Major League Soccer club Seattle Sounders FC.

Career
In July 2020, Baker-Whiting signed with Tacoma Defiance.

In May 2021, Baker-Whiting signed with Seattle Sounders FC. He made his MLS debut for the Sounders on May 16 as a substitute against Los Angeles FC. He was 16 years and 46 days old, making him among the youngest players to play in league history.

Career statistics

Club

References

External links
 

2005 births
Living people
Soccer players from Seattle
American soccer players
Association football midfielders
USL Championship players
Major League Soccer players
Tacoma Defiance players
Seattle Sounders FC players
Homegrown Players (MLS)
MLS Next Pro players
United States men's youth international soccer players